Patterson is an extinct town in Catron County, in the U.S. state of New Mexico. Located approximately six miles west of Horse Springs, the precise location of the town site is unknown to the GNIS.

A post office was established at Patterson in 1884, and remained in operation until 1906. The community was had the name of Richard Chase Patterson, a pioneer settler.

References

Ghost towns in New Mexico
Landforms of Catron County, New Mexico